The Charter of Fundamental Rights and Freedoms is a document enacted in 1991 by the Czechoslovak Federative Republic and currently continued as part of the constitutional systems of both the Czech Republic and Slovak Republic.

Differences in the successor states of Czechoslovakia

In the Czech Republic, the document was kept in its entirety as a separate document from the constitution, but imbued with the same legal standing as the constitution. It is a part of the Constitutional Code of the Czech Republic – a sum of constitutional laws and other sources of law, explicitly named in the constitution – that possesses the highest level of legal force.

In Slovakia, the basic provisions of the Charter were integrated directly into the Slovak constitution. Though these legal provisions articles are substantively the same, there are some differences, such as the Slovak contention that "the privacy of correspondence and secrecy of mailed messages and other written documents and the protection of personal data are guaranteed."

The inclusion of the goals of the Charter directly into the Slovak constitution means that only the Czech Republic currently has a "Charter of Fundamental Rights and Basic Freedoms".

Creation of the Czech Constitution

An agreement was signed after the negotiations of the prime ministers Václav Klaus and Vladimír Mečiar on in August 1992, that set the date of the dissolution of Czechoslovakia to 31 December 1992. The dissolution was approved by the Parliament in November of the same year.

Because of an opposition from the Civic Democratic Alliance (ODA), the Civic Democratic Party (ODS) and especially the prime minister Klaus – who described the Charter as "the weeds of the Constitution" – the Charter never became a part of the Constitution. The time was running out and the members of the parliament had to reach an agreement on the text of the new Czech Constitution. Because of that a new legal term Constitutional Code was created, so that the Charter could have a legal authority similar to the constitution without being a part of the constitution. Viktor Knapp – a distinguished Czech lawyer – called this at the time "a result of a strange legislative compromise".

Comparison with the US legislation

The document is somewhat analogous to the United States Bill of Rights, although its provisions tend to be more specific, and imbue its citizens with more and different rights than in United States constitutional law, which by contrast recognizes and protects natural rights rather than grant legal entitlement.

References

Constitution of the Czech Republic
Government of the Czech Republic
Political charters
Czechoslovak law
Law of the Czech Republic
Law of Slovakia
National human rights instruments
1991 in law
1991 documents